De Kameleon aan de ketting is a Dutch family film. The film is based on the books of  about the adventures of two identical twins and their boat, the opduwer De Kameleon. The film is a sequel to De Schippers van de Kameleon and Kameleon 2, being released 16 years after this last film. Director Steven de Jong returned for the sequel but the two main actors where re-cast. The film also has a significant role for Nando Liebrecht, an actor with Down syndrome. A reviewer for NRC Handelsblad called the main actors a sidecharacter in their own story.

Reception 
The film was the 15th most watched film at its opening weekend. After a run of 3 weeks it only grossed $188,361. Performing significantly worse than its predecessors, which earned 4.6 million and 2.7 million dollars.

References

External links 
 Website
 

2021 films
Dutch children's films
Films about families
2020s Dutch-language films